The London Medical Papyrus is an ancient Egyptian papyrus in the British Museum, London. The writings of this papyrus are of 61 recipes, of which 25 are classified as medical while the remainder are of magic. The medical subjects of the writing are skin complaints, eye complaints, bleeding (predominantly with the intent of preventing miscarriage through magical methods) and burns.

The papyrus was first published in 1912 in Leipzig by Walter Wreszinski.

The papyrus is also known as BM EA 10059. 

The papyrus is linked to fallout from the Bronze Age Santorini volcanic eruption, also referred to as the Minoan eruption, dated to  1629–1628 BCE.

See also

Ebers Papyrus
Edwin Smith Papyrus
List of ancient Egyptian papyri

References

External links 

Ancient Egyptian medical works
Ancient Egyptian objects in the British Museum
Egyptian papyri